This article discusses the phonology of the Chukchi language. The Chukchi language, also known as Chukot or Luorawetlan, is a language spoken by around 5 thousand people in Chukotka Autonomous Okrug. The endonym of the Chukchi language is Ԓыгъоравэтԓьэн йиԓыйиԓ (Lyg'"orawetl'en Jilyjil), pronounced as [ɬəɣˀorawetɬˀɛn jiɬəjiɬ]. Chukchi is in the Chukotko-Kamchatkan family, and thus is closely related to Koryak, Kerek, Alyutor, and more distantly related to Itelmen, Southern Kamchadal, and Eastern Kamchadal.

Vowels 
Generally, Chukchi is noted to have 5 or 6 distinct vowels, with /e1/ and /e2/ being identical in pronunciation but behaving differently in the language. A similar occurrence exists in Yup'ik Eskimo. Chukchi phonotactics are (C)V(C).

Phonetic notes:

 [ə] is not phonemic and is used to break off illegal consonant clusters.
 Word finally /e1/ and /a/ reduce to a schwa, while other vowels may get dropped.

Vowel Harmony 
Chukchi is notable for its vowel harmony based on vowel height, with /i/, /u/, and /e1/ belonging to the recessive group and /e₂/, /o/, and /a/ belonging to the dominant group. The three-vowel pairs alternate with each other and cannot cooccur within a word.

Consonants 
Chukchi has 13 consonants. The language lacks voiced stops, which are only found in loanwords.

 [ɸ, x, ɻ̊, j̊] are heard as allophones of /β, ɣ, ɻ, j/ after voiceless stops.
 /ɻ/ is mostly heard as an alveolar trill [r], when in between vowels.
 /s/ is phonetically [s~t͡ʃ] in free variation and only occurs in the men's dialect.
 /t͡ʃ/ becomes [s] before /q/ and only occurs in the women's dialect.
 /s/, /t͡ʃ/ and /ɻ/ have different distributions between men's and women's dialects.

There is also a supersegmental glottalisation realised as a glottal stop preceding a vowel. It is not treated as a consonant as a result of phonotactics and reduplication patterns.

References 

Phonologies by language
Chukchi people
Chukotko-Kamchatkan languages